The feed URI scheme was a suggested uniform resource identifier (URI) scheme designed to facilitate subscription to web feeds; specifically, it was intended that a news aggregator be launched whenever a hyperlink to a feed URI was clicked in a web browser.
The scheme was intended to flag a document in a syndication format such as Atom or RSS. The document would be typically served over HTTP.

History 
In 2006 the feed URI scheme was supported by several popular desktop aggregators, including NetNewsWire, FeedDemon, Safari, and Flock.  no effort seems to be underway to officially register the scheme at IANA.

Critics hold that the purpose of the feed URI scheme is better served by MIME types, or that it is not a user-friendly solution for the problem of feed subscription, since a user who has not installed the appropriate software will receive an unhelpful browser error message on clicking a link to a feed URI.

These expired drafts were not submitted as Internet drafts; the author later contributed to the work on the atom standard.

Syntax 
The syntax for a feed URI may be expressed in Backus–Naur form as follows:
 <feed_uri> ::= "feed:" <absolute_uri> | "feed://" <authority> <path-abempty>
Specifically, a feed URI may be formed from any absolute URI (such as an absolute URL) by prepending feed, and as a special case, may be formed from any absolute http URI by replacing the initial http:// with feed://.

The  and  constructs in the syntax are specified in RFC 3986 also known as STD 66. Therefore, the following are two examples of valid feed URIs:

 feed:https://example.com/entries.atom
 feed://example.com/entries.atom

References 

URI schemes
Web syndication
Proposals